Polk is an unincorporated community in Will County, Illinois, United States. It lies just north of the Kankakee County line and south of Beecher.

References

Unincorporated communities in Illinois
Unincorporated communities in Will County, Illinois